Tinoderus singularis is a species of beetle in the family Carabidae, the only species in the genus Tinoderus.

References

Panagaeinae